Be Yourself (ビー・ユアセルフ) is the second album by Carlos Toshiki & Omega Tribe, released on February 8, 1989 by VAP and Warner Music Japan.

Background 
American singer Joey McCoy, who participated in a backing vocalist in the previous album Down Town Mystery, officially joined as a new member in July 1988 with the release of "Reiko." With his addition, the album was the first with a lineup of four people. It was also the first album to feature ten songs instead of nine, and the ten-song track listing would become a staple in their next albums. This work was produced by Koichi Fujita and arranged by Hiroshi Shinkawa. In addition, Tetsuji Hayashi, a senior in the office who worked on many works by Kiyotaka Sugiyama & Omega Tribe and Momoko Kikuchi, also participated in the work, with Hitoshi Haba as a new composer and Jerry Hey as a horn arranger. The mixing was handed by Eiji Uchinuma, who worked on the previous work.

Many songs that the members composed are also included, with two songs co-written by vocalist Carlos Toshiki, keyboardist Toshitsugu Nishihara, and guitarist Shinji Takashima, with a song solely composed by Nishihara. This album will be the first recording of a work co-written by the three.

Track listing

Charts

References 

1989 albums
Omega Tribe (Japanese band) albums